Tampa Bay Reforestation and Environmental Effort, Inc. more commonly known as "T.R.E.E. Inc.", is a grassroots nonprofit environmental organization based out of the Tampa Bay Area. It promoted the practice of volunteers raising and then planting trees along the interstates, roadways, and parks of the greater Tampa Bay Area to beautify and preserve the environment.  To date, T.R.E.E. Inc. has planted over 30,702 trees and palms.

Early years 1983-1987
A group of friends started this organization because they wanted to see more trees being planted in the Tampa Bay Area.  On February 8, 1983, T.R.E.E. Inc. was incorporated under Florida law.

T.R.E.E. Inc.'s modus operandi, throughout the first 22 years of its existence, had been to purchase bare root tree seedlings, grow them in 1-gallon containers for one growing season, step them up into 3-gallon containers for a second growing season, and then donate or out-plant them prior to their third growing season.

The variety of trees that was most commonly used during this period was the genetically improved or superior North Florida Slash Pine (Pinus elliottii var. "elliottii"). It was selected due to its adaptability, rapid growth, and relative ease of maintenance after establishment. Hardwood trees during that time were typically purchased as 4" potted seedlings. Varieties typically used were Sweetgum (Liquidambar styraciflua), Pignut Hickory (Carya glabra), and Loblolly Bay (Gordonia lasianthus).

Transition years 1988–1989
In January 1988, William Moriaty stepped down as president so that he could relocate to Gainesville, Florida with his wife, Karen Cashon, as she would be attending the University of Florida later that year. As a result, an almost entirely new slate of directors served from 1988 to 1989. Vice President Bob Scheible was the only founding member to serve during this two-year period in the same capacity that he did at the organization's creation.

Major program initiatives, 1990–2004
1990 was the major turning point that would set the stage for revised and newly created corporate philosophies that would guide T.R.E.E. Inc. for well over the next decade of its existence.

The genetically improved or superior North Florida Slash Pine began to lose favor to the local indigenous Longleaf Pine (Pinus palustris), "Ocala" Race Sand Pine (Pinus clausa), and South Florida Slash Pine (Pinus elliottii var. "densa"). The availability of Florida grown bare root hardwood seedlings further broadened the plant palette to include Baldcypress (Taxodium distichum), Tulip Poplar (Liriodendron tulipifera), and Southern Magnolia (Magnolia grandiflora) as well as dependable stand-bys, Sweetgum and Pignut Hickory (Carya glabra).

Due to a major push by members living in Pinellas County, Florida, the organization's name was changed through Florida law on July 24, 1991, from its original title of Tampa Reforestation and Environmental Effort, Inc. to Tampa Bay Reforestation and Environmental Effort, Inc.

On August 9, 1991, T.R.E.E. Inc. was awarded 501 (c) (3) tax-exempt status from the United States Internal Revenue Service as an Educational organization.

Major programs and milestones 2005–2021
Beginning in 2005, T.R.E.E. Inc. secured its first major sponsor, Esurance. Esurance is an online insurance provider based out of San Francisco, California. Beginning with the Esurance St. Pete Beach Tree-Athalon planting on September 24, 2005, T.R.E.E. Inc. had an additional ten volunteer tree plantings sponsored by Esurance.

The Esurance plantings were a radical departure from T.R.E.E. Inc.'s previous plantings which were conducted almost solely through the use of 3-gallon material grown at its own nursery. This gave T.R.E.E. Inc. the unprecedented opportunity to plant large-sized 30-gallon trees, affording it the opportunity to finally conduct plantings with a much higher visual impact. In addition, the Esurance projects led to a gradual phasing out of T.R.E.E. Inc. having to depend so heavily upon its own nursery to obtain trees.

In addition to the Esurance plantings, T.R.E.E. Inc. began introducing programs such as the Tulip Poplar Repopulation Program, Orange and Seminole Counties, Florida, where Florida Peninsula Tulip Poplar (Liriodendron tulipifera) grown from the seed of trees native to East Central Florida area had been planted in Orlando, Winter Park, Altamonte Springs, Sanford, and Casselberry, Florida.

Similar programs included the Longleaf Pine Repopulation Program in Temple Terrace, Florida, and the Egmont Key Reforestation Initiative at Egmont Key State Park in Hillsborough County, Florida.

In December 2008, T.R.E.E. Inc. received a major contribution from The Home Depot Foundation and was also instrumental in assisting the National Football League's Environmental Program and Florida Forest Service with a Super Bowl Trail of Trees planting initiative in April 2009.

In August 2017 TREE, Inc. created a checklist of the "Trees and Palms of the Botanical Treasure Gardens of the Plant City Commons Community Garden (Occupying the location formerly known as the Teaching Garden of the University of Florida), Plant City Campus, Hillsborough Community College, 2001 E. Cherry Street, Plant City, Florida".

TREE, Inc. has also to date conducted six projects related to raising public awareness about the Park Road Outfall/East Canal watershed in Plant City, Florida, which are contributors to the Tampa Bay estuary. These projects included providing an educational signing in July 2019 for a wetland located at the outer perimeter of the Plant City, Florida campus of Hillsborough Community College; the planting of native wetland trees within the campus in March 2020 and January 2022; the planting of a Memory Tree at the campus' Botanical Treasure Gardens in September 2020; the planting of 25 Baldcypress trees at Mike E. Sansone Community Park in January 2021, and; the planting of a Sweetgum tree along the East Canal at Gilchrist Park on Earth Day 2021 (April 22, 2021) - - that planting was a part of the Hillsborough 100 Conservation Challenge sponsored by the Hillsborough Soil and Water Conservation District and planted by Future Farmers of America students from Tomlin Middle School and Plant City High School in Plant City, Florida.

On May 18, 2020, a new logo for the organization was adopted and replaced the pine and oak rendition logo that had been used since 1983.

Awards
Received "Award of Greatest Merit in the Partnership Category" in 1991 from the Florida Urban Forestry Conference for its partnering with the Florida Department of Transportation for tree plantings along the Tampa Bay area's interstate highways.

Received two major awards in 2019: "Organization of the Year" from the City of St. Petersburg's Parks and Recreation Department, and "Project of the Year" from the Hillsborough Soil and Water Conservation District.

Received the "Outstanding Environmental Nonprofit Award" from Keep Pinellas Beautiful on December 4, 2020.

Received the "Outstanding Tree Advocacy Award" for 2020 from the Florida Urban Forestry Council on March 3, 2020.

Mission
There are five major components to the organization's Mission:

 Beautify and reforest the Tampa Bay area through the planting of native trees.
 Further public awareness about the merits of reforesting public lands.
 Further public awareness about the planting and preserving of native trees and underutilized trees of special interest.
 Work in conjunction with, and in support of, other organizations with similar purposes.
 Be a clearinghouse of scientific and educational information to the public on the merits of tree species selection for use in the Tampa Bay area in accordance with the intent of its I.R.S. tax-exempt 501(c)(3) status.

Accomplishments
T.R.E.E. Inc. has over the past 40 years:
 Conducted 616 reforestation projects. 
 Furnished the original design, and subsequent installation on November 23, 1996, of what would become the Richard T. Bowers Historic Tree Grove at the Museum of Science and Industry (Tampa).  
 With the permission of the Florida Department of Transportation, made history by planting over 4,600 native trees in ten (10) TREE DAY on I-75 projects along Interstate 75 in Hillsborough County, Florida from 1986 to 1996.
 Donated and planted approximately 30,702 trees and palms, utilizing an estimated 3,500 volunteers since T.R.E.E. Inc.'s creation on February 8, 1983.
 Assisted in a joint tree planting effort with the National Football League and Florida Division of Forestry consisting of over 20 projects in the Greater Tampa Bay Area for Super Bowl XLIII.
 Worked in conjunction with the City of St. Petersburg, Florida and Keep Pinellas Beautiful to reforest and beautify Clam Bayou Nature Preserve, with the First Phase of this effort starting on May 5, 2018, and a Second Phase having been conducted on October 27, 2018. Work with the same partners occurred on August 24, 2019, with the planting of South Florida Slash Pines at the Boyd Hill Nature Preserve, with plans to continue tree plantings at the Preserve over the coming years.
 Partnered with the City of Tampa, Florida, the Florida Aquarium and Keep Tampa Bay Beautiful, Inc. to conduct a Picnic Island Riparian Planting Initiative. The first Phase consisted of the planting of 400 Red Mangrove (Rhizophora mangle) propagules on April 27, 2019. The second Phase occurred on November 2, 2019, consisting of the removal of invasive exotic plants and the planting of over 500 Florida native trees, consisting of 14 varieties. A third Phase was conducted on April 24, 2021, and consisted of the planting of 150 Red Mangroves propagules, 10 Sea Grapes, 15 Silver Buttonwoods, and 27 Muhly Grass.
 Was a partner with the Hillsborough Soil and Water Conservation District, Rotary International, Sustany Foundation, and Hillsborough Conservation and Environmental Lands Management in the planting of 20,000 Longleaf Pine tubelings at the Lower Green Swamp Preserve in Hillsborough County, Florida on June 12, 2021.
 Was the 2022-2023 recipient of Cherrylake nursery's "1,000 Trees for 1,000 Years" planting initiative, installing Baldcypress trees at seven locations throughout the Tampa Bay area, beginning with a retention pond in Seminole, Florida on December 3, 2022, and ending at the Little Manatee River Corridor Nature Preserve in Wimauma, Florida.

2023 Directors
President – William Moriaty

Vice President – John Fuller

Treasurer – Harvey A. Hunt, P.E.

Secretary – Michael Riebe

Public Relations Manager – Ashlé Baines

Environmental Program Manager – Harriet Fuller

Newsletter
T.R.E.E. Inc. has a quarterly online newsletter available to the public called Arbor Bio.

References

Nature conservation organizations based in the United States
Environmental organizations based in Florida
Forests of Florida
Reforestation
1983 establishments in Florida
Tampa Bay area
Organizations established in 1983